Kerstin Emhoff (née Mackin; born March 18, 1967) is an American film producer and founder and CEO of the production company Prettybird. 

Under her leadership the company's films have won Grammy Awards, Emmy Awards, and Cannes Lions, while she personally won a News & Documentary Emmy Award in 2012. She was president of the "film craft" jury of the 2020 Cannes Lions International Festival of Creativity. Her former husband Douglas Emhoff later married Kamala Harris.

Career
After film school, Emhoff moved to Los Angeles, where she got a job at a small production company and "was immediately hooked into the world of short form." By 2002, Emhoff was a principal (and executive producer) at HSI Productions. HSI creatives at that time included Paul Hunter, Hype Williams, and Diane Martel.

In 2007, Emhoff together with director Paul Hunter left HSI to co-found the production company Prettybird. Ad Age named Prettybird as Creativity's 2015 Production Company of the Year.

Emhoff is Prettybird's president. Under her leadership the company's films have won Grammy Awards, Emmy Awards, and Cannes Lions, while she personally won a News & Documentary Emmy Award in 2012. She was executive producer of Manhunt: The Search for Bin Laden (2013), which won the Primetime Emmy Award for Outstanding Documentary or Nonfiction Special; she has also produced Emmy Award-winning The Tillman Story. She was also producer of the 2020 documentary AKA Jane Roe.

She served on the board of directors of the Association of Independent Commercial Producers (AICP) for over ten years, and was the AICP President for Western United States. In 2015, she chaired the AICP annual show "The Art & Technique of the American Commercial."

In 2016, she founded the non-profit Pipelines, a not-for-profit initiative to increase opportunities in advertising for diverse young people. In 2020, Pipelines is scheduled to launch its mobile app, designed to connect companies looking for diverse talent with young people looking for jobs in tech and entertainment.

When Ava DuVernay partnered with Los Angeles mayor Eric Garcetti, Netflix, HBO and others to set up the Evolve Entertainment Fund (EEF), Emhoff was named to its first Advisory Board. According to Billboard, "The EEF is a public-private partnership between the City of Los Angeles, industry leaders in entertainment and digital media, non-profit organizations and educational institutions which is dedicated to building career pathways into film, television and music for women, people of color and low-income Angelenos through paid internships, focused mentoring and an ongoing series of workshops and panels."

In 2020, she joined with two of her partners at Prettybird (Ali Brown and Paul Hunter) to co-found Ventureland, a new multi-platform entertainment company, with long-time collaborator John Battsek. Ventureland, based in Los Angeles and London, will produce both documentaries and scripted content.

In 2020, she serves as president of the "film craft" jury of the Cannes Lions International Festival of Creativity.

Personal life
She was raised in Minneapolis, Minnesota, and has mainly Swedish ancestry. In 1992, she married Douglas Emhoff, with whom she has two children, Cole and Ella. They divorced 16 years later. She chose to retain her married name, legally and professionally. Emhoff's ex-husband later married Kamala Harris.

Kerstin Emhoff's two children have described the coparenting relationship between Emhoff and their stepmother, Kamala Harris, as, "very healthy". She attended the 2021 presidential inauguration, where Harris was sworn-in as vice president of the United States.

Selected filmography
 The Tillman Story (2010), executive producer
 Manhunt: The Search for Bin Laden (2013), executive producer
 Pretty Hurts (2013), Beyoncé music video, executive producer
 We Are the Giant (2014), executive producer
 Mojave (2015), associate producer
 XOXO (2016), executive producer
 The Monster (2016), co-producer
 We Are X (2016), executive producer
 The Final Year (2017), executive producer
 Legion of Brothers (2017), executive producer
 Ready for War (2019), producer
 AKA Jane Roe (2020), producer

Awards
News & Documentary Emmy Award for Outstanding Informational Programming – Long Form (2012)

References

External links

 "How PRETTYBIRD President & Co-Founder Kerstin Emhoff Has Built A Powerhouse ProdCo." (August 24, 2018) Interview with Jordan Brady.

1967 births
American women film producers
American people of Swedish descent
American Lutherans
Businesspeople from Minneapolis
News & Documentary Emmy Award winners
Living people
American women company founders
American company founders
American women chief executives
American film studio executives
21st-century American businesswomen
21st-century American businesspeople